Neuronal acetylcholine receptor subunit alpha-9, also known as nAChRα9, is a protein that in humans is encoded by the CHRNA9 gene. The protein encoded by this gene is a subunit of certain nicotinic acetylcholine receptors (nAchR).

α9 subunit-containing receptors are notably blocked by nicotine.  The role of this antagonism in the effects of tobacco are unknown.

This gene is a member of the ligand-gated ionic channel family and nicotinic acetylcholine receptor gene superfamily. It encodes a plasma membrane protein that forms homo- or hetero-oligomeric divalent cation channels. This protein is involved in cochlea hair cell function and is expressed in both the inner and outer hair cells (OHCs) of the adult cochlea, although expression levels in adult inner hair cells is low. The activation of the alpha9/10 nAChR is via olivocochlear activity, represented by cholinergic efferent synaptic terminals originating from the superior olive region of the brainstem.  The protein is additionally expressed in keratinocytes, the pituitary gland, B-cells and T-cells.

Selective block of α9α10 nicotinic acetylcholine receptors by the conotoxin RgIA has been shown to be analgesic in an animal model of nerve injury pain.

See also
 Nicotinic acetylcholine receptor

References

Further reading

External links 
 
 

Ion channels
Nicotinic acetylcholine receptors